Lynchat is a small village, situated 2 miles northeast of Kingussie in Inverness-shire, Scottish Highlands and is in the Scottish council area of Highland.

The River Spey which rises in Loch Insh and the Insh Marshes located 1–2 miles south and east of the village, passes the villages to the south. The main A9 road passes to the north of  Lynchat.

References

Populated places in Badenoch and Strathspey